In bioinformatics, LIGPLOT is a computer program that generates schematic 2-D representations of protein-ligand complexes from standard Protein Data Bank file input. The LIGPLOT is used to generate images for the PDBsum resource that summarises molecular structure.

References 

Molecular modelling software
Science and technology in Cambridgeshire
South Cambridgeshire District